Litvínovice is a municipality and village in České Budějovice District in the South Bohemian Region of the Czech Republic. It has about 2,700 inhabitants.

Administrative parts
Villages of Mokré and Šindlovy Dvory are administrative parts of Litvínovice.

Climate
On 11 February 1929, the lowest temperature ever in the Czech Republic and Czechoslovakia of -42.2 °C was recorded in Litvínovice.

References

Villages in České Budějovice District